Sir Arthur Elibank Havelock,  (7 May 1844 – 25 June 1908) was a career British colonial governor, serving as Governor of Sierra Leone from 1880, of Natal, of Madras, of Ceylon from 1890 to 1895, and of Tasmania from 1901 to 1904.

Early life and family
Havelock was born in 1844 in Bath, Somerset, the fifth surviving son of Lieutenant-Colonel William Havelock and Caroline Elizabeth Chaplin, and the nephew of Sir Henry Havelock. The family moved to India in 1844, where his father commanded the 14th Light Dragoons but was killed in action at the Battle of Ramnagar on 22 November 1848. The Havelocks returned to England briefly, but settled in Ootacamund in 1850, where Havelock attended school until he completed his education in London.

Military career
In 1860, Havelock entered the Royal Military College, Sandhurst, and on 14 January 1862 was gazetted an Ensign in the 32nd (Cornwall) Light Infantry. He was promoted Lieutenant on 10 April 1866, and was stationed at Gibraltar (1866–7), at Mauritius (1867–8), then at the Cape Colony (1868–72). He returned to Mauritius in 1872 as the colony's paymaster, and was promoted to Captain on 1 February 1873, serving as aide-de-camp to Selby Smith, the acting governor, and later to the Governor of Mauritius, Sir Arthur Hamilton-Gordon.

Havelock held several key posts in the colonial civil service from 1874: Chief Civil Commissioner of the Seychelles (1874–75), and Colonial Secretary and Receiver General in Fiji (1874–75). He returned to England in 1876, and retired from the British Army as a captain in March 1877.

Colonial service
Havelock joined the colonial civil service upon leaving the army, and was sent to the West Indies in 1877 as President of Nevis. In 1878, he was transferred to Saint Lucia as the colony's Administrator, before returning to the Seychelles as Chief Civil Commissioner.

Governor of Sierra Leone
In February 1881, Havelock was assigned his first governorship in Sierra Leone and the West African settlements. In addition, he was appointed British consul to Liberia, and became involved in a major border dispute between Liberia and Great Britain. The border between Sierra Leone and Liberia had been unsettled for years, the disputed area – lying between the Sewa and the Mano rivers – known as the Gallinas territory. On 20 March 1882, Havelock led a flotilla of four British gunboats to the Liberian capital Monrovia, issuing a demand that Liberia cede all territories up to the Mafa River, and pay an indemnity of £8,500 to British merchants for injuries inflicted by tribes inhabiting the area of the British claim. A treaty was signed, but its ratification was refused by the Liberian Senate, and Havelock and his gunboats returned to Monrovia in September that year, demanding immediate acknowledgement of the British claims, and ratification of the treaty.

The senate refused once more, and the British quietly occupied the claimed territory in March 1883. Despite the support of the United States, Liberia realised that resisting the British claim was futile, and signed the treaty in London on 22 November 1885. The border was finally settled in 1903 by a mixed commission from both countries.

Governor of Trinidad
In 1885, Havelock was appointed Governor of Trinidad.

Governor of Natal
In 1886, Havelock became Governor of Natal, where he dealt with the annexation of Zululand in 1887, and an unsuccessful rebellion led by Dinuzulu kaCetshwayo in 1888. He returned to England in 1889, and served on the international anti-slavery commission in Brussels.

Governor of Ceylon

In March 1890, Havelock was appointed Governor of Ceylon (now Sri Lanka), where his actions included extending the country's railways to Kurunegala and Bandarawela, and abolishing the 'paddy tax', a levy on rice cultivation. He was also held in great esteem among the aristocracy of Sri Lanka, with two prominent families appointing him Godfather to the heirs. One such godson was the grandson of Muadliya Solomnon Carolis de Fonseka while the other was the son of Solomon Dias Bandaranaike. The de Fonseka family named their estate Havelock from its original name Katukele Greenlands, along with various parts of their large estate (now Havelocktown) after Havelock, these include Elibank road and Havelock Pass (now forming the bridge).

Governor of Madras
Havelock returned to his childhood home of India as Governor of Madras from 1896 to 1900.

Governor of Tasmania
Havelock left Madras in 1901, and was offered the governorships of the Straits Settlements in Malaya and Victoria in Australia, which he declined due to ill health caused by many stressful years in tropical climates. He was then offered the post of Governor of Tasmania, which he accepted in May 1901, arriving in Hobart to be sworn in on 8 November. His health, however, continued to decline and he made the decision to cut short his term as governor to only two-and-a-half years. He notified the premier, William Propsting, of his resignation on 6 January 1904, and left Tasmania on 16 April.

Later life
Havelock returned to England, and retired to Torquay, Devon.

On 15 August 1871, Havelock had married Anne Grace, née Norris, who died in early 1908.
Havelock himself died at Bath, Somerset less than six months later on 25 June 1908. He was survived by a daughter.

Honours
 CMG: Companion of the Order of St Michael and St George 1880
 KCMG: Knight Commander of the Order of St Michael and St George 1884
 GCMG: Knight Grand Cross of the Order of St Michael and St George 1895 
 GCIE: Knight Grand Commander of the Order of the Indian Empire 16 March 1896 – on appointment as Governor of Madras
 GCSI: Knight Grand Commander of the Order of the Star of India 29 April 1901 – for his services as Governor of Madras

The Havelock Bridge spanning Godavari river at Rajahmundry, India was named after him in the year 1900.

References

1844 births
1908 deaths
Governors of British Ceylon
Governors of British Trinidad
Governors of Madras
Governors of Tasmania
Knights Grand Commander of the Order of the Star of India
Knights Grand Commander of the Order of the Indian Empire
Knights Grand Cross of the Order of St Michael and St George
Graduates of the Royal Military College, Sandhurst
Governors of Natal
Governors of British Seychelles
Governors of Sierra Leone
British Mauritius people
Governors of British Saint Lucia
Governors of Nevis
Colonial Secretaries of Fiji